Paddington Basin is the name given to a long canal basin, and its surrounding area, in Paddington, London.

The basin commences 500 m south of the junction known as Little Venice, of the Regent's Canal and the Paddington Arm of the Grand Union Canal and runs for a similar length east–west. It was opened in 1801, with Paddington being chosen as the site of the basin because of its position on the New Road which led to the east, providing for onward transport. In its heyday, the basin was a major transshipment facility, and a hive of activity.

Since 2000, the basin has been the centre of a major redevelopment as part of the wider Paddington Waterside scheme and is surrounded by modern buildings.

Redevelopment

 

The contractors of a developers' consortium in partnership with the Canal and River Trust (and its predecessor British Waterways) in 2000 drained, cleaned and repaired the basin. In the latter half of the 20th century the basin attracted small and medium-sized commercial offices and is in part lined by specialist and private healthcare wings of St Mary's Hospital. The basin has become home to a wide range of companies, such as Marks & Spencer, the Head Office of which moved from Baker Street in 2004.

Most of the land north of the canal basin forms the 2010s development Merchant Square, North Wharf Road. Its main developer European Land and Property is a joint venture of Simon and David Reuben (the Reuben brothers) and the Jarvis family. In all, the development around Paddington Basin is creating  of offices, homes, shops and leisure facilities.  Its western buildings are mainly complete and occupied as at 2018. 
Completed buildings
Paddington Walk is a block of 232 flats designed by Munkenbeck & Marshall that completed in August 2005.
The Point (224,000 sq ft) and Waterside (240,000 sq ft) are office blocks designed by Terry Farrell and Partners and the Richard Rogers Partnership respectively.

The original plan for the eastern end envisaged a commercial development focused around the Grand Union Basin and included the Winding building and the Grand Union building. The revised scheme comprised six linked blocks of 30 storeys totalling  of mixed-use space, but the project was discarded when it looked like the site would be needed by the Health Campus (see below).

The Health Campus scheme collapsed in 2005 and in February 2006 the Paddington Development Corporation - which became European Land and Property Ltd - submitted a new planning application. Branded as Merchant Square, this proposed  of mixed-use space spanning 6 buildings, including 554 residential units and 58% commercial space. Planning permission was granted on 1 March 2007. A revised planning application was subsequently submitted and was approved on 19 May 2011. 4 Merchant Square, a 16-storey block of 196 flats, designed by Tryfon Kalyvides Partnership, completed in 2013; 5 Merchant Square (formerly Carmine) is a 14-storey office block of  designed by Mossessian and Partners which became fully let by 2015. Part of the building is occupied by Marks & Spencer, which also occupies the Waterside Building.

In late 2021, Premier Inn constructed their largest, non-airport, hotel in Greater London on the north bank of the basin. The development was completed in March 2022.

Merchant Square surrounds a central square. A life-size sculpture in memory of Sir Simon Milton was unveiled in September 2014 by  Eric Pickles MP, Secretary of State for Communities and Local Government. The sculpture, designed by Bruce Denny, follows Sir Simon's pivotal role in facilitating the regeneration of Paddington Basin.

Pedestrian bridges
The basin has creatively designed pedestrian bridges:
The Rolling Bridge 
The Fan Bridge

The Fan Bridge opened in autumn 2014 and moves with the motion of a Japanese hand fan.

Transport
The nearest London Underground stations are Edgware Road and Paddington, the latter also being served by National Rail.

See also

Canals of the United Kingdom
History of the British canal system
List of canal basins in the United Kingdom

References

External links
Paddington Basin YouTube
Paddington Basin - Canal and River Trust
Paddington Central
Merchant Square, Paddington

Redevelopment projects in London
Infrastructure in London
Regent's Canal
Canals in London
Canal basins in England and Wales
Geography of the City of Westminster
Canals opened in 1801
Paddington